The 1st World Orienteering Championships were held in the village of Fiskars, Finland, 1–2 October 1966.

Participants from eleven nations competed in the championships: Austria, Bulgaria, Czechoslovakia, Denmark, East Germany, Finland, Great Britain, Hungary, Norway, Sweden and Switzerland. The medals were distributed between Sweden (3 gold, 1 bronze), Finland (3 silver, 1 bronze), Norway (1 gold, 2 bronze) and Switzerland (1 silver medal).

The men's individual course had 11 controls over 14.1 kilometres, while the women's individual course had 10 controls over 8.1 kilometres.

The first individual world champions in orienteering came from Norway and Sweden. Winner of the men's competition was Åge Hadler from Norway. Hadler regarded the eighth control, which was located in thick forest, as the most difficult, where the last part of the leg required meticulous map reading and frequent checking of the compass. Ulla Lindkvist from Sweden won the women's competition. Sweden won the men's relay, which had four legs, with a margin of nearly eight minutes. Sweden also won the women's relay, which had three legs, with a margin of 21 seconds to silver medalist Finland.

The championships were attended by President of Finland, Urho Kekkonen, who was present at the finishing area.

Medalists

Results

Men's individual

Women's individual

References 

World Orienteering Championships
1966 in Finnish sport
International sports competitions hosted by Finland
October 1966 sports events in Europe
Orienteering in Finland
Raseborg